Facies orbitalis may refer to:

 Facies orbitalis corporis maxillae
 Facies orbitalis ossis zygomatici